is the fourteenth single by Do As Infinity, released in 2002. It was used as the fifth ending to the anime InuYasha.

This song was included in the band's compilation album Do the A-side.

Track listing
 
 "One or Eight"
  (Instrumental)
 "One or Eight" (Instrumental)

Chart positions

References

External links
 "Shinjitsu no Uta" at Avex Network
 "Shinjitsu no Uta" at Oricon

2002 singles
2002 songs
Do As Infinity songs
Avex Trax singles
Inuyasha songs
Song recordings produced by Seiji Kameda
Songs written by Dai Nagao